The 1956 Vermont gubernatorial election took place on November 6, 1956. Incumbent Republican Joseph B. Johnson ran successfully for re-election to a second term as Governor of Vermont, defeating Democratic candidate E. Frank Branon.

Republican primary

Results

Democratic primary

Results

General election

Results

References

Vermont
1956
Gubernatorial
November 1956 events in the United States